Werdersch is a subdialect of Low Prussian, which itself is a subdialect of Low German. This dialect is spoken in Poland and was spoken in the former province of West Prussia. Werdersch is closely related to Nehrungisch and Plautdietsch.

History 
Werdersch developed after Dutch-speaking immigrants from the Netherlands moved in the sixteenth century to the region where Werdersch is spoken. Half of the immigrants were Mennonites, the other half were Protestants. Though not all were from Holland (some were German colonists), they were all referred to as Hollanders. Catherine the Great called some of these Mennonite immigrants further east to Russia.

Many of the Mennonites spoke Low German. The early Anabaptists from the province of Friesland spoke Frisian. Groups of Flemish Mennonites and Frisian Mennonites were early arrivals; they later also continued on to Russia. The difference between these two groups was religious rather than ethnic. Most of the founders of the Molotschna Colony and the Chortitza Colony were Flemish Mennonites who spoke Werdersch. Both of these colonies were in Russia (now Zaporizhzhia Oblast, Ukraine), and were the origin of much of the modern-day Russian Mennonite diaspora.

Phonology 

Werdersch has alveolar /r/, like Eastern Low Prussian. Werdersch has, at least in some words, long /u/ as short /u/ and long /i/ as short /i/. Molotschna-Plautdietsch is descended from Werdersch. In originally closed syllables (excluding before original /r/, /ld/ and /lp/), /e/ is given as front vowel /a/. In contrast to Nehrungisch and Chortitza-Plautdietsch, it and Molotschna-Plautdietsch have High German /au/ as /au/. In contrast to Nehrungisch and Chortitza-Plautdietsch, it and Molotschna-Plautdietsch have no shortened /u/ before /p/. Werdersch has shortened u before gutturals. It has  for High German , English through. Werdersch had a in the closed syllable before l as o. Molotschna-Plautdietsch has palatal oral stops <tj> and <dj>. For Chortitza-Plautdietsch [eiw]/[ɛːw] it has [au]/[ɔ].
Plautdietsch varieties which have the reflex [uː] of MLG ū, almost always develop a centralized reflex of MLG ō. Molotschna forms which do not have the reflex [yː] often have a central reflex, [ʉː].

In less conservative varieties, the nucleus of words such as heet has also begun to fall and further dissimilate itself from its off-glide. Speakers from the earlier Midwestern settlements sometimes have a raised allophone of words, such as Äkj: [ee]. 
Molotschna speakers from the original late 1800s settlements often lack an off-glide in some OA sounds, but do have off-glides in other OA sounds (e.g., Oabeid 'work' [ɔɐbaid] vs Foagel 'fowl' [foːɣl], koake 'to cook' [koːke], and Büak 'book' [boːk]). Molotschna speakers from Mexico with the traditional Molotschna Dialect OA form retain the original off-glide in words like Foagel 'fowl' [foɐɣl].

List of isoglosses within Werdersch:
/a/ mostly as /au/ 
/n/-loss in 
Long /o/ is shortened before l+dental; umlaut lacks in words such as 
Final -n
Loss of /n/ in an-, in- un- before fricatives, /r, l, m, n and g.
,  etc. versus ,  etc. 
Shortening of /î/ to /i/ before velars
Shortening of /û/ to /u/ before velars
 /i, e and ar/ becoming /e, a and or/ respectively

Grammar 
Molotschna-Plautdietsch uses dative case, but not accusative case. Molotschna-Plautdietsch is the dominant Plautdietsch variety in Fernheim Colony. Molotschna-Plautdietsch has  for them. Molotschna-Plautdietsch has the formal address using the pronoun of the third person. Molotschna-Plautdietsch has infinitive and plural, both ending with /-ə/. For verbs with two preterite forms, Molotschna-Plautdietsch mostly uses the velar form with /au/. It has the velar stem vowel of Dutch and a limited number of palatal preterite forms. Molotschna-Plautdietsch has  for the infinitive have. Molotschna-Plautdietsch has palatalization given as c and ɟ, which probably used to exist in West Prussia as well.

List of surnames 
This is a list of surnames common among Mennonites in Canada originating (indirectly) from Russia, in descending frequency. The number in brackets indicates the number of places they are higher than on a 20-entry list of surnames of Mennonites in Canada originating (indirectly) from Russia. This list only includes surnames higher on the list concerning West Prussian Mennonites than on the list of surnames of Mennonites in Canada.
Penner (4) 
Wiens*
Janzen (12)
Enns (6)
Janz*
Froese*
Regehr*
Harder (8)
Ewert*
Pauls*
Fast*
Franz*
Epp*
Fieguth*
Albrecht*
* name not on the 20-entry list

Surnames of Frisians include Abrahams, Arens, Behrends, Cornelius, Daniels, Dirksen, Doercksen, Frantzen, Goertzen, Gossen, Harms, Heinrichs, Jantzen, Pauls, Peters, Siemens, and Woelms. Surnames that mostly occur in Frisian congregations include Adrian, Brandt, Buller, Caspar, Flaming, Hamm, Harms, Isaak, Kettler, Kliewer, Knels, Stobbe, Teus, Töws, and Toews; additionally, Pauls, Peters, Unruh, and Fransen and Schmidt. Nickel also is a name mainly of Frisian Mennonites denomination.Unger is a name in congregation of Frisian Mennonites denomination.Unger is a name in congregation of Frisian Mennonites denomination. Foth/Vodt and Arentsen are most likely of Frisian congregations.

Settlements

In Europe 
The congregations of Flemish Mennonites in the area of the Weichselwerder were Ellerwald, Fürstenwerder, Heubuden, Ladekopp, Rosenort, and Tiegenhagen. Orlofferfelde and Thiensdorf had a congregation of Frisian Mennonites.

Daughter settlements of Molotschna in Ukraine (German names of the period) included:

The Caucasus Mountains had the following daughter colonies:

In Russia 
Northeast Russia had the following daughter colonies:

In North America 
Mennonite migrants to the United States in the 19th century mainly originated from the Molotschna Colony and settled in the Midwestern US. This group expanded into the Central Valley of California, but never formed a large Mennonite community there. In 1874, Mennonites from the Molotschna region settled around Wichita, Kansas. These settlers originated from the Krimmer Mennonite Brethren, Alexanderwohl, so-called Prussian Mennonites, and Volhynia Mennonites. The Alexanderwohl, Mennonite Brethren, and General Conference Mennonite Church are all denominations of Molotschna origin in central Kansas.

In the 1870s, many immigrating Mennonites settled in Henderson, Nebraska; Mountain Lake, Minnesota; Corn, Oklahoma; and Fresno, California. Reedley, California (near Fresno) also has a sizable population of Mennonite origin. Mennonites founded Fresno Pacific University, as well as Bethel College and Tabor College in Kansas.

In Manitoba, Canada, the East Reserve had a minority of its Mennonites originating from Molotschna. In the 1940s, about 800 Mennonites from the West Reserve immigrated to northern Mexico, most of whom were Canadian Sommerfelder or Kleine Gemeinde Mennonites; thus, Molotschna-Plautdietsch is now spoken in Mexico. The Plautdietsch spoken in Mexico, Bolivia, and Texas differs from that spoken farther north. Many speakers of Plautdietsch show main features of both Molotschna-Plautdietsch and Chortitza-Plautdietsch.

In South America 
In Paraguay, Molotschna-Plautdietsch is spoken in the Neuland Colony, and some residents of Fernheim Colony and Tres Palmas Colony have Molotschna ancestry. Friesland Colony was founded by people moving from Fernheim Colony.

In Brazil, Santa Catarina and Rio Grande do Sul have residents of Werdersch cum Molotschna origin. Convenção Brasileira das Igrejas Evangélicas Irmãos Menonitas has half the members of Mennonite congregations in Brazil. Molotschna-Plautdietsch is also spoken in Southern Brazil. 

The denomination Flemish Mennonites was predominant in the Żuławy Malborskie, the denomination Frisian Mennonites in the Żuławy Elbląskie. Later groups of settlers had more predominant representation of Frisian Mennonites from more southerly (Werder) areas.

Modern Mennonite congregations 
Evangelical Mennonite Conference is a denomination of Molotschna origin limited to Canada. More than half of its churches are in Manitoba province. Fellowship of Evangelical Bible Churches has most of its churches in the Midwestern US or Manitoba, Canada. Mennonite Brethren are a denomination originating from Molotschna. Mennonite Church USA has more members of Molotschna rather than of Chortitza origin.

In 1950, the first Mennonite Brethren congregation in Western Europe was founded in Neuwied, Germany, by people from the Soviet Union and Poland. The next two congregations founded were Neustadt an der Weinstraße in 1960 and Lage, North Rhine-Westphalia in 1965. The Baptisten-Brüdergermeinde Bonn (Baptist-Brethren Congregation of Bonn), later renamed, was founded in 1974, resulted in the foundation of Bibelseminar Bonn. The first Mennonite congregation in Bielefeld was founded in the Brackwede district in 1974 (the congregation is now in the Heepen district). The first Mennonite Brethren congregation founded by Aussiedler in the Federal Republic of Germany was founded in Espelkamp in 1974. The German association Bund Taufgesinnter Gemeinden was founded by Baptist and Mennonite Brethren congregations in 1989.

International Community of Mennonite Brethren  
The United States probably have the largest number of members of International Community of Mennonite Brethren in America. Brazil has Convenção das Igrejas Evangélicas Irmãos Menonitas and Paraguay has Vereinigung der Mennoniten Brüder Gemeinden Paraguays. Its members in Germany are: Arbeitsgemeinschaft Mennonitischer Brüdergemeinden Deutschland, Verband Mennonitischer Brüdergemeinden in Bayern, and BeF (Taufgesinnte Gemeinden).

Congregations in Germany (1998)

Bund Taufgesinnter Gemeinden association

Arbeitsgemeinschaft Mennonitischer Brüdergemeinden

Independent Mennonite Brethren

Verband Mennonitischer Brüdergemeinden in Bayern association

References

Bibliography

External links 
 Quantitative perspectives on variation in Mennonite Plautdietsch Doctoral thesis including additional information

Low Prussian dialect
German dialects
Languages of Poland
Languages of Ukraine